Syd is a diminutive form (and hypocorism) of Sydney or a nickname.

 Syd,  American singer-songwriter
 Syd Barrett, British musician and co-founder of the rock band Pink Floyd
 David "Syd" Lawrence, former English cricketer
 Syd Levy (born 1922), South African tennis player
 Syd Little, English comedian and straight man to Eddie Large in the double act Little and Large
 Syd Straw, American folk singer
 Syd'quan Thompson, American football cornerback

Hypocorisms
English masculine given names
English feminine given names
English unisex given names